This is a list of knights and dames of the Order of Australia.

History
The Order of Australia is the only Australian order of chivalry, although certain dynastic British orders of chivalry, such as the Order of the Garter, the Order of the Thistle and the Royal Victorian Order, may still be awarded to Australians by the monarch of Australia. It was established on 14 February 1975 by Queen Elizabeth II on the recommendation of the Prime Minister of Australia, Gough Whitlam, to recognise Australian citizens and other persons for achievement, meritorious service, or both.

Recipients who are not Australian citizens may be appointed honorary knights or dames, although no such appointments have been made.

At its establishment, the Order of Australia included three grades: companion (AC), officer (AO) and member (AM), and two divisions: civil and military. On 24 May 1976, the grades of knight (AK) and dame (AD), and the Medal of the Order of Australia (OAM), were established by the monarch on the advice of Prime Minister Malcolm Fraser, and the Civil Division was renamed the General Division. Knight and Dame of the Order of Australia superseded Companion of the Order as the highest grade, however Knight and Dame were only awarded in the General Division of the Order. The then Governor-General, Sir John Kerr, reported to Sir Martin Charteris on 13 April 1976 that Malcolm Fraser wanted the level of knighthood to be "an extremely rare award" that would recognise "extraordinary and pre-eminent achievement and merit" and that no more than two would be made in any year. Sir Garfield Barwick, the then chairman of the Order of Australia Council, described such people as "super-knights" and Kerr thought the prospect of finding two each year "very slim".

On 14 March 1981 the Queen co-signed letters patent amending the Constitution of the Order of Australia to create her son, the heir to the Australian throne, Charles, Prince of Wales, a knight of the Order of Australia. This procedure was necessary as Prince Charles, not being an Australian citizen, would not otherwise have qualified for a substantive knighthood and would have been eligible only for an honorary award.

Following the 1983 election, Prime Minister Bob Hawke recommended the abolition of the knight and dame grades. On 3 March 1986, the monarch co-signed letters patent revoking the categories of knight and dame – existing knights and dames were not affected by this change.

Following his election in 2013, Prime Minister Tony Abbott advised the Queen to reinstate the categories of dame and knight. On 19 March 2014, the Queen co-signed letters patent to bring this into effect, although no announcement of this change was made until 25 March. At that time it was also announced that the governor-general would be the principal knight or dame of the order; the incumbent but outgoing governor-general, Quentin Bryce, was immediately made a dame of the order and the new governor-general, General Peter Cosgrove, became a knight immediately upon his swearing-in on 28 March.

On 7 January 2015 the Queen co-signed letters patent that created her consort, Prince Philip, Duke of Edinburgh, a knight of the Order of Australia on the same basis as applied to Prince Charles in 1981. This award was publicly announced in the Australia Day Honours list of 26 January 2015, along with the knighthood of Air Chief Marshal Angus Houston, former Chief of the Defence Force.

On 2 November 2015, Abbott's successor as prime minister, Malcolm Turnbull, announced that the categories of knight and dame in the Order of Australia would again be discontinued, although existing holders of the titles would not be affected. The Queen amended the Constitution of the Order by letters patent signed on 29 October and the amendment was gazetted on 22 December 2015.

List of knights and dames

See also
 Australian knights and dames
 Living Australian knights and dames
 List of Companions of the Order of Australia

Notes

References 

Order of Australia
 
 
 
 
Australia